WAJV (98.9 FM) is a radio station  broadcasting a gospel music format. Licensed to Brooksville, Mississippi, United States, the station serves the Columbus-Starkville-West Point, Tupelo area. The station is owned by Urban Radio Broadcasting, through licensee GTR Licenses, LLC. The station has applied for a construction permit from the U.S. Federal Communications Commission (FCC) for an increase to 13,000 watts effective radiated power.

References

External links
http://www.joy989.com/

Gospel radio stations in the United States
Urban Radio Broadcasting radio stations
AJV